El fogón de los gauchos is a 1935  Argentine musical film directed and written by Julio Irigoyen.

Main cast
Diana Bernal
Silvia Cecy
Alberto Miranda
Roberto Roldán

External links

1935 films
1930s Spanish-language films
Argentine black-and-white films
Films directed by Julio Irigoyen
Argentine musical films
1935 musical films
1930s Argentine films